Au Bijou (Au Bijou Uhren & Schmuck) is the oldest jewellery in Basel, Switzerland, the Huber family business now in its 11th generation. In 1656, the goldsmith Martin Huber founded the company producing bijou, jewellery included in articles of clothing. Today, Patrik-Philipp Huber continues in the tradition and manufactures his own jewellery.

See also 
List of oldest companies

References

External links 
Homepage
Pro InnerStadt Basel Profile

Jewellery companies of Switzerland
Manufacturing companies based in Basel
Companies established in the 17th century
17th-century establishments in Switzerland
Swiss brands